Hasmarul Fadzir (born 4 November 1986 in Selangor) is a Malaysian footballer who plays as defensive midfielder for Selangor United. He played for Sime Darby in the Malaysia Premier League in 2013 season. He can also play as a central defender. In 2015, he join AirAsia FC in the Malaysia FAM League.

External links
 

1986 births
Living people
Malaysian footballers
People from Selangor
Malaysian people of Malay descent
Association football midfielders
Sime Darby F.C. players
Selangor FA players
Felda United F.C. players
PKNS F.C. players